College Boarding House (Spanish:La casa de la Troya) is a 1959 Spanish comedy film directed by Rafael Gil and starring Ana Esmeralda, Arturo Fernández and Pepe Rubio.

Cast
 Ana Esmeralda as Carmiña Castro  
 Arturo Fernández as Gerardo Roquer  
 Pepe Rubio as Casimiro Barcala  
 Julio Riscal as Madeira  
 Rafael Bardem as Don Laureano  
 Félix de Pomés as Don Juan  
 Cándida Losada as Jacinta  
 Félix Fernández as Don Ventura  
 Erasmo Pascual as Don Angelito  
 María Bassó as Tona  
 María Isbert as Mensajera  
 Enrique S. Guzmán as Augusto  
 Raúl Cancio as Maroño  
 María Granada as Filo  
 Manuel Gil as Adolfo Pulleiro 'Panduriño' 
 Elena Puerto as La Pachequito  
 Mercedes Alonso as Moncha  
 Ventura Oller as Samoeiro  
 Ricardo Tundidor as Seminarista  
 Guillermo Hidalgo as Octavio  
 José Manuel Ramírez as Estudiante  
 Emiliano Redondo as Estudiante  
 José María Tasso as Mollido  
 Eumedre as Criado del pazo  
 Matilde Muñoz Sampedro as Monja 1ª  
 Adela Calderón 
 Luisa Hernán 
 Manuel Arbó as Catedrático  
 Pablo Muñiz 
 Licia Calderón as Charito 'La Mañitas'  
 Manolo Morán as Minguiños  
 José Isbert as Don Servando

References

Bibliography 
 Bentley, Bernard. A Companion to Spanish Cinema. Boydell & Brewer 2008.

External links 
 

1959 comedy films
Spanish comedy films
1959 films
1950s Spanish-language films
Films based on works by Alejandro Pérez Lugín
Films directed by Rafael Gil
1950s Spanish films